In Tibetan cuisine, Chexo is a rice dish,  made with yogurt.

References

Tibetan cuisine
Rice dishes